Ancylodes is a genus of snout moths. It was described by Émile Louis Ragonot in 1887, and is known from Spain, Libya, Iraq, Sri Lanka, as well as Australia.

Species
 Ancylodes argentescens (Hampson, 1912)
 Ancylodes bonhoti Hampson, 1901
 Ancylodes dealbatella (Erschoff, 1874)
 Ancylodes lapsalis (Walker, 1859)
 Ancylodes pallens Ragonot, 1887
 Ancylodes penicillata Turner, 1905

References

Phycitini
Pyralidae genera
Taxa named by Émile Louis Ragonot